Lars Christensen (born 27 March 1965 in Silkeborg) is a Danish rower. Together with Martin Haldbo Hansen he finished fourth in the double sculls at the 1996 Olympics.

External links 
 
 

1965 births
Living people
Danish male rowers
People from Silkeborg
Olympic rowers of Denmark
Rowers at the 1992 Summer Olympics
Rowers at the 1996 Summer Olympics
World Rowing Championships medalists for Denmark
Sportspeople from the Central Denmark Region